Articulate may refer to:

 Articulate!, a board game in which players describe words from different categories
 Articulate brachiopods, brachiopods with toothed hinges and simple opening and closing muscles
 Articulate sound, to move the tongue, lips, or other speech organs in order to make speech sounds
 Articulated vehicle, a vehicle which has a pivoting joint in its construction
 Articulate (TV series), a public television series about creative artists

See also
 Articulation (disambiguation)
 Articulata (disambiguation)